Jonas Algimantas Boruta (11 October 1944 – 19 December 2022) was a Lithuanian Roman Catholic prelate.

Boruta was born in Lithuania and was ordained to the priesthood in 1982. He served as titular bishop of Vulturaria and as auxiliary bishop of the Roman Catholic Archdiocese of Vilnius, Lithuania, from 1997 to 2002 and as bishop of the Roman Catholic Diocese of Telšiai, Lithuania, from 2002 until his resignation in 2017.

References

1944 births
2022 deaths
20th-century Roman Catholic bishops in Lithuania
21st-century Roman Catholic bishops in Lithuania
Lithuanian Roman Catholic bishops
Bishops appointed by Pope John Paul II
Recipients of the Order of the Cross of Vytis
People from Kaunas